The Fiestas Patrias (literally Homeland Holidays) of Chile consist of two days, with a third one added on some years:
 18 September, in commemoration of the proclamation of the First Governing Body of 1810, and marking the beginning of the Chilean Independence process.
 19 September, known as the "Day of the Glories of the Army".
 Since 2007, 17 September (if it should be a Monday) or 20 September (if it should be a Friday) will be included as well.
 Since 2017, 17 September (if it should be a Friday) will also be included.

Within Chile the Fiestas Patrias are often referred to as the Dieci ocho, or "18th" because the celebration occurs on 18 September. Unofficially, the celebration can last for around a week, depending on when it falls. For example, if the 18th is a Wednesday, public holidays are from Wednesday the 18th to Friday the 20th and celebrations begin the afternoon of Tuesday the 17th and continue until Sunday the 22nd. It is held close to the spring equinox of the Southern Hemisphere so it doubles as a spring festival. Chile's Declaration of Independence happened on 12 February. Most schools and jobs declare a week-long vacation for the holiday. This day is very important to the Chilean people because they are celebrating their freedom from Spanish rule.

Activities
The celebration of Fiestas Patrias is an expression of Chilean culture. Traditional activities associated with the Dieci ocho include Chilean rodeo, dancing the cueca, going to fondas, and barbecue.
Officially, activities on September eighteen are centered on a religious celebration "Te Deum Ecuménico de Fiestas Patrias". This ceremony, which is organized by the Catholic Church and led by the Archbishop of Santiago, has taken place since 1811 when it was started by José Miguel Carrera. In 1971, President Salvador Allende asked that the celebration become more ecumenical, encompassing the diverse religious beliefs throughout the country. The ceremony itself begins at 11:00 am in the Plaza de Armas.
Military parades and civil school parades are held on this day in major cities and towns nationwide. Many Chileans travel during the Fiestas Patrias to visit family, friends and relatives in other parts of the country and join the celebrations there. In Santiago, many people travel to resorts on the Pacific coast, especially Viña del Mar and the Litoral Central region. It is estimated that 2 million Chileans—nearly one-eighth of the country's population—travel during this holiday.

19 September, the anniversary of the installation of the First Government Council and the very first military parade in Chilean history, marks the grand finale: the Great Military Parade of Chile commemorating the glories of the Chilean Army, on Santiago's O'Higgins Park and overseen by the President of Chile in his/her performance of his/her constitutional mandate as Commander-in-Chief of the Armed Forces. Attracting millions of people, and simulcast live on radio, television and on the Internet, the parade, led by the Chilean Armed Forces (Chilean Army, Chilean Navy and Chilean Air Force) and the Carabineros de Chile, plus since 2019 the Investigations Police of Chile, takes place in the afternoon, and (when 19 September is a Sunday, Monday, Tuesday or Wednesday) marks the end of the holiday.

Traditional food

Consumption of traditional Chilean foods is one of the principal displays of the Fiestas Patrias. Chileans prepare these foods in their homes, or they go to fondas. Fondas are venues, often tents, prepared and decorated for the Fiestas Patrias where traditional Chilean dishes and beverages are served. The largest fondas are found in Parque O'Higgins. Each year the Chilean President kicks off the Fiestas Patrias celebrations at one of these locales. For many years, the selected fonda was La Grandiosa Bertita.
The predominant food associated with the Fiestas Patrias are Chilean empanadas, which are a sort of bread pastry. The filling of these empanadas consist of pino, a mixture of chopped beef and onion, as well as half of a hard-boiled egg, and an olive. Many Chileans also throw a barbecue for the Fiestas Patrias. During this time sales of meat products exceed $50 million.

During the Fiestas Patrias the preferred drink is chicha, a lightly alcoholic beverage typically made from grapes, although apple chicha is popular in southern Chile. Red wine enjoys popularity during the holiday, while pisco, the so-called "national liquor", becomes secondary.

Alfajores are a typical dessert. They consist of two lightly breaded cookies joined with manjar, a sweet filling made from caramelized condensed milk.

Use of the flag
In Chile, it is mandatory to hang the Chilean flag from every building in the country on 18 and 19 September (and 21 May as well). The flag should be in perfect condition, hung from a white pole or from the front of every building, horizontally or vertically. If hung vertically, the star should always be in the upper left corner, visible from the front of the building. Violation of this rule is punishable with fines in local currency of up to 40,000 pesos (about US$50), although it is not strictly enforced.

Gallery

References

Armed Forces days
National days
Historiography of Chile
Society of Chile
Chilean culture
September observances
Annual events in Chile
Spring (season) events in Chile